Social life may refer to:

 an individual's  interpersonal relationships with people within their immediate surroundings or general public. 
 Social relation (sociology)

As a proper name
 Social Life, an album by Koufax

Social science disambiguation pages